Mitchell Gene Ben Hanson (born 2 September 1988) is an English former professional footballer who played as a defender. He spent 2006 to 2011 at Derby County, playing on loan at Port Vale and Notts County, before signing with Eastwood Town via Oxford United in 2011, where he became joint-caretaker-manager in October 2012. He moved to Gresley in summer 2013.

Club career
Born in Derby, Derbyshire, Hanson had extensive reserve team experience and made his debut for the reserve team whilst a schoolboy. Hanson's first taste of first team at Derby was appearing as an unused substitute in the 5–0 defeat away to Reading in April 2006. Hanson, who graduated through the academy, signed his first professional contract with Derby in June 2007. After struggling to break into Paul Jewell's first team, Hanson joined League One strugglers Port Vale on a season long loan, despite struggling with a calf injury. He returned to Derby in April 2008, without making a first team appearance for the "Valiants".

He made his first team debut for Derby as an 89th-minute substitute in a 4–1 victory over Brighton & Hove Albion on 4 November 2008. and joined Notts County on a months loan in November 2008. He returned to Derby County on New Years Day 2009, after having appeared in five league games for the "Magpies" He signed a new two-year deal with the "Rams" in January 2009.

Early in the 2009–10 season, Hanson sustained a dislocated kneecap which ruled him out of contention for a year, eventually resuming full training in late September 2010. He returned to action with a 60-minute appearance in the reserves 3–1 defeat at Rotherham United the following month. After failing to break into the first team picture, Hanson's Derby contract was cancelled by mutual consent five months early in January 2011. He played for Oxford United reserves on trial in February 2011. Two months later he signed a contract until the end of the season; he made two substitute appearances for the club and was not offered a new contract in the summer.

In September 2011, he signed for Conference North club Eastwood Town. The "Badgers" suffered relegation in last place in 2011–12, winning just four games all season. He was appointed caretaker manager, alongside Paul Riley, following the departure of former manager John Ramshaw in October 2012.

He signed with Gresley of Northern Premier League Division One South in September 2013. He helped the "Moatmen" to a ninth-place finish in 2013–14. He became Gresley's first choice penalty taker in the 2014–15 season, and successfully converted the first five penalties of the season. Gresley reached the play-off semi-finals in 2015, losing to Leek Town. He retired in September 2015 due to injury.

International career
Hanson has played for England at under-18 level, showing his versatility by adapting to a holding midfielder role, rather than his preferred position in defence.

Career statistics

References

1988 births
Living people
Footballers from Derby
English footballers
Black British sportspeople
Association football defenders
Derby County F.C. players
Port Vale F.C. players
Notts County F.C. players
Oxford United F.C. players
Eastwood Town F.C. players
Gresley F.C. players
English Football League players
National League (English football) players
Northern Premier League players
English football managers
Eastwood Town F.C. managers
Northern Premier League managers